Beethoven's 4th is a 2001 American direct to video comedy film. It is the third sequel to the 1992 film, Beethoven and is the fourth installment in the Beethoven film series. It was released on December 4, 2001. It is the last film to feature Judge Reinhold as Richard Newton, Julia Sweeney as Beth Newton, Joe Pichler as Brennan Newton, and Michaela Gallo as Sara Newton.

Plot 

Richard Newton checks in with his two children, Sara and Brennan, before school. The children love their St. Bernard dog, Beethoven, whom they are keeping for relatives, but their parents do not, and want to get rid of him. So the children begin taking the dog to Obedience Training led by a former army sergeant. Brennan falls in love with a girl named Hayley, while Beethoven literally destroys the obstacle course in one day. To top it all off, Beethoven hits the army sergeant in the groin with a leash causing him to kneel over in pain.

Meanwhile, the rich Sedgewick family owns a pampered and well-behaved St. Bernard that looks exactly like Beethoven, named Michelangelo. Michelangelo and young Madison Sedgewick are friends, but her busy parents, Reginald and Martha, are always neglecting her. In fact, Reginald is the only one who seems to try to play with her. Beethoven, meanwhile, runs after a loose hot dog cart, and ends up on a merry-go-round. Michelangelo has gotten loose, as well, and is now on the same merry-go-round. Brennan and Sara mistake him for Beethoven and take him home. The real Beethoven is mistaken for Michelangelo, and grabbed by Jonathan Simmons, the Sedgewick family's butler and taken to their mansion.

Sara is surprised when Michelangelo wipes his feet on the welcome mat and folds the napkins with his teeth at dinner. The Sedgewicks notice the change in "their dog" too, when he bolts Simmons to the ground to get a piece of turkey. That night, Beethoven hears Madison whimpering because of a bad dream, and comforts her. At the next obedience class, Michelangelo leaves everyone in astonishment, by finishing the entire new obstacle course, while the sergeant is announcing the course.

Meanwhile, Beethoven ruins a dinner party, when a man named Nigel tries to kidnap him. A therapist points out to Martha that the reason "Michelangelo" is acting this way is because he is the first one exhibiting "symptoms". The therapist suggests that it may be because Martha does not care about anyone but herself. Richard is concerned about "Beethoven", and starts acting out to get "Beethoven" to misbehave again too. Richard drinks toilet water, chases the mailman, etc. Michelangelo ends up catching on, and starts behaving like Beethoven.

The Sedgewick family start playing fetch and swimming with Beethoven. But as the Sedgewicks and Beethoven are hiking, Nigel (who turns out to be Simmons' sidekick) kidnaps Beethoven and locks him in a warehouse, for a ransom of $250,000. But Beethoven breaks out and secretly switches places with Michelangelo at the obedience graduation. The real Michelangelo is found by the Sedgewicks, and Simmons and Nigel are arrested by two FBI agents. The real Beethoven is found by the Newtons, and he graduates. The Sedgewicks and Newtons then meet up at a fork on the road, though, they never find out about the switching of Beethoven and Michelangelo.

Cast 
 Judge Reinhold as Richard Newton
 Julia Sweeney as Beth Newton
 Joe Pichler as Brennan Newton
 Michaela Gallo as Sara Newton
 Kaleigh Krish as Madison Sedgewick
 Matt McCoy as Reginald Sedgewick
 Veanne Cox as Martha Sedgewick
 Jeff Coopwood as Bill
 Dorien Wilson as Marlowe
 Mark Lindsay Chapman as Jonathan "Johnnie" Simmons
  Nick Meaney as Nigel Bigalow
 Natalie Elizabeth Marston as Hayley
 Art LaFleur as Sergeant Rutledge
 June Lu as Mrs. Florence Rutledge
 Patrick Bristow as Guillermo
 Joyce Brothers as herself

Reception
On Rotten Tomatoes the film has a score of 0% based on reviews from 8 critics.

References

External links 
 

2001 films
2001 comedy films
American comedy films
2000s English-language films
Films about dogs
Films about pets
Universal Pictures direct-to-video films
Direct-to-video sequel films
Films directed by David M. Evans
Films about animals
Beethoven (franchise)
2000s American films